Ram babu or Ram Babu is an Indian given name:

 Khanuparude (Rambabu Prasai), Nepalese politician
 Cameraman Gangatho Rambabu, a 2012 Telugu film
 Rambabu Kodali, present Director of the National Institute of Technology Jamshedpur, India
 A. G. S. Ram Babu, Indian politician and former Member of Parliament elected from Tamil Nadu.